KUMR is a radio station located inDoolittle, Missouri and broadcasting on 104.5 MHz FM; it is on the air with a Lite AC format which later twisted into an adult contemporary format. The station calls itself Sunny 104.5.

The KUMR call letters were once used by KMST, the Missouri University of Science and Technology's radio station.

See also
List of radio stations in Missouri

References

External links

Radio stations established in 2010
Mainstream adult contemporary radio stations in the United States